North Korea competed at the 2015 World Aquatics Championships in Kazan, Russia from 24 July to 9 August 2015.

Medalists

Diving

North Korean divers qualified for the individual spots at the World Championships.

Men

Women

Mixed

Swimming

North Korean swimmers have achieved qualifying standards in the following events (up to a maximum of 2 swimmers in each event at the A-standard entry time, and 1 at the B-standard):

Men

Women

Synchronized swimming

North Korea fielded a full squad of ten synchronized swimmers to compete in each of the following events.

References

Nations at the 2015 World Aquatics Championships
2015 in North Korean sport
North Korea at the World Aquatics Championships